Thakur Sinhasan Singh (born 1899) was a social and political leader during the Indian National Congress He was the first Member of Parliament (MP) from Gorakhpur. Sinhasan Singh was prominent among this band of Congressmen of U.P, as he was one of those who had been serving Congress for more than 25 years.

Early life
Sinhasan Singh was born to Bhola Singh in Ropan Chappra in Deoria District of Uttar Pradesh, British India. He completed his B.A. from Hindu University and secured his law degree from Lucknow University. Sinhasan Singh finished his studies in 1927 and started his practice as a lawyer the same year at Deoria.  In 1926 he shifted to Gorakhpur where he soon established himself as an advocate of note. An eminent citizen of Gorakhpur, he was a member of the Gorakhpur District Board from 1928 to 1935 where he also served as its Junior Vice-President.

Political career
Sinhasan Singh started his political career in 1929 when he joined Hindu Sabha and became Secretary of its Deoria branch. However, his connections with the Hindu Sabha lasted only for a year and in 1929, he became a Congressman. He was elected Secretary of the Deoria Congress Committee in 1929, and in 1939 became President of the Gorakhpur city Congress Committee as well as Vice-President of the District Congress Committee, Gorakhpur- posts which he continued to occupy until 1946. He was again President of the Gorakhpur City Congress Committee from 1950 to 1951. He participated in the ‘Individual Satyagraha’ of 1940 and was arrested and sent to jail for three months. After his release, he was arrested again and not set free till
October 1941. For his active role in the country-wide upheaval of 1942, he was arrested in August 1942 and was kept in detention till December 1943.

Singh has considerable parliamentary experience at his back. He was twice elected to the U.P. Legislative Assembly, in 1937 and 1946. In the first general elections, under the new Constitution, he offered himself as a Congress candidate for the House of the People from the Gorakhpur South Parliamentary constituency, and though opposed by the General Secretary of the Hindu Mahasabha and candidates of the K.M.P.P and Socialist Party, he won the seat easily.

The subjects in which he was especially interested in the Parliament were labour and foreign affairs. Due to his association with the Trade Union movement, and the fact that he lived in Gorakhpur, which was an important industrial town and has a large concentration of the railway labour. Singh was very well posted with the problems of the labour.

In 1950 he was announced President of the O.T. Railwaymen's Union, Gorakhpur. He served three terms as a Member of the Legislative Assembly (MLA) in the Central Province before India's Independence. Then, he was elected three times as MP to the House of the People (Lok Sabha) in the Parliament of India.

Personal life
He was married at the age of eleven and had 6 children. He was a voracious reader, history and economics being his favourite subjects.

1899 births
India MPs 1952–1957
Lok Sabha members from Uttar Pradesh
India MPs 1957–1962
India MPs 1962–1967
People from Gorakhpur district
Year of death missing
Hindu Mahasabha politicians